The Bennett Spires are two sharp peaks overlooking the head of Jones Valley in the Neptune Range, Pensacola Mountains. They were mapped by the United States Geological Survey from surveys and from U.S. Navy air photos, 1956–66, and named by the Advisory Committee on Antarctic Names for Staff Sergeant Robert E. Bennett of the United States Air Force, a radio operator of the Electronic Test Unit in the Pensacola Mountains during the summer of 1957–58.

References
 

Mountains of Queen Elizabeth Land
Pensacola Mountains